Thierry St-Cyr (born November 7, 1977) is an engineer and former Bloc Québécois politician in Quebec, Canada. He served as the Member of Parliament for Jeanne-Le Ber from 2006 to 2011.

Education and career background 
Born in La Plaine, Quebec, he has a Bachelor's Degree in Computer Engineering at the Université de Sherbrooke and Université de technologie de Compiègne in France as well as an International Bachelor's in science and nature in Geneva.

In 1998 and 1999, worked as a management consultant with CGI in Quebec. He has also been a president and shareholder of an information technology company until 2000, when he started working for TETRA Technologies, Inc., an international oil and gas services company. In 2001, he was an associate professor of engineering at the Université de Sherbrooke. He was actively involved with the Université de Sherbrooke, serving as president, administrator and honorary member of its engineering student association, president of Le Collectif, the school's campus newspaper, and board member of the school's faculty of engineering in 2000 and 2001. He has worked as a quality and metric control at Motorola in Montreal from 2001 until 2006 when he entered politics.

Political history 
St-Cyr ran for the Bloc in the 2004 election in Jeanne-Le Ber, where he lost to Liza Frulla of the Liberal Party of Canada by 72 votes. He won the 2006 election.

He served as vice-chair of the standing committee on citizenship and immigration, and its subcommittee on agenda and procedure. Served as a member of the standing committee on finance and its subcommittee on Bill C-28. Served as an associate member of the standing committees on liaison, foreign affairs and international development, and human resources, social development and the status of persons with disabilities.

Thierry St-Cyr was re-elected for his second term in the 2008 Canadian election. However, in the 2011 election, he was defeated by the NDP candidate Tyrone Benskin.

He ran in the 2012 Quebec provincial election for the Parti Québécois in Verdun, losing to incumbent Henri-François Gautrin of the Quebec Liberal Party.

Electoral record (incomplete)

* Result compared to Action démocratique.

External links 
 
 Personal website : https://web.archive.org/web/20120825133132/http://www.thierrystcyr.info/

Bloc Québécois MPs
Canadian engineers
French Quebecers
Members of the House of Commons of Canada from Quebec
Université de Sherbrooke alumni
1977 births
Living people
People from Terrebonne, Quebec
Parti Québécois candidates in Quebec provincial elections
21st-century Canadian politicians